Lemonjelly.ky is the debut album by the British duo Lemon Jelly, released on 23 October 2000. It compiles all nine tracks originally released on the duo's first three limited edition EPs: The Bath, The Yellow and The Midnight, although minor changes were made for the album release.

Critical reception

Lemonjelly.ky received a score of 79 out of 100 based on nine reviews on review aggregator Metacritic, including "generally favorable reviews" from critics.

Track listing

The recording details are in the EP articles:
 The Bath EP (1998)
 The Yellow EP (1999)
 The Midnight EP (2000)

References

2000 debut albums
Lemon Jelly albums
XL Recordings albums
Albums produced by Nick Franglen
2000 compilation albums